Journey, a novel by James Michener published in 1989, was expanded from a section originally cut from his large novel Alaska (1988). The book depicts five men, one of whom was an English Lord, journeying in 1897-99 from Great Britain through Canada to Dawson, Yukon, to participate in the Klondike gold rush. According to the novel's afterword, the section was cut from  the original book because Alaska already contained a chapter on the Alaskan side of the gold rush. It was decided that chapter (which eventually became Journey) could stand on its own as a short novel.

Journey Prize
In 1989, Michener donated the royalty earnings from the Canadian edition of Journey, published in Canada by McClelland & Stewart, to endow the Journey Prize, an annual Canadian literary award worth Cdn$10,000 that is awarded for the year's best short story published by an emerging Canadian writer.

References

1988 American novels
Novels by James A. Michener
Random House books
Novels set in Yukon
Fiction set in 1897
Fiction set in 1898
Novels set in the 1890s